This is a list of slums in Ghana.

Amui Djor
Ashaiman
Agbogbloshie
Old Fadama
Jamestown
Kojokrom
New Takoradi
Suame Magazine
Aboabo
Maamobi & Nima

See also

 List of slums

Slums
Ghana
Slums